Santiago Cathedral may refer to:
Bilbao Cathedral, Spain
Santiago de Compostela Cathedral, Spain
Santiago Metropolitan Cathedral, Chile